Oakham railway station serves the town of Oakham in Rutland, England. The station is situated almost halfway between  –  to the west – and  –  eastward on the (as built) Syston and Peterborough Railway, the line is the Birmingham to Peterborough Line.

Oakham is the only surviving passenger railway station in Rutland.

History
The station was opened by the Midland Railway on 1 May 1848. The building was designed by the company architect, Edward Wood of London, and is Grade II listed.

Station masters

Frederick Neal 1848–1850 (subsequently station master at Tamworth)
S. Wollerton ca. 1850s
Alfred Fewkes 1858–1865 (subsequently station master at Loughborough)
Joseph Kilby 1865–1876
Arthur Chadwick 1877–1894
Robert Herbert 1894–1905 (formerly station master at Dursley)
Charles Ravenhall 1905–1914 (formerly station master of Kegworth)
W.J. Wearn 1914–1924 (subsequently station master at Ilkley)
Ernest Shadwell 1924–1927 (subsequently station master at Matlock)
E.W. Conisbee 1928–1936 (formerly station master at Long Itchington)
Joseph Henry Marshall 1936–1940
Noel Manton 1940–1946 (formerly station master at Wilnecote)
George A. Webber 1946 - 1953
E.G. Dilley 1953 - 1960 (formerly station master at Kegworth)

Buildings

The station building, the nearby level crossing signal box and footbridge are each listed buildings. The signal box was the prototype for the Airfix kit signal box. The station footbridge was refurbished between October 2020 and April 2021.

Services
From Oakham there is an hourly service in both directions operated by CrossCountry, with some additional peak-hour trains.

Despite managing the station, East Midlands Railway only operates a limited number of services to/from it. 
A single daily return service to London St Pancras commenced on 27 April 2009 running via  and is notable for being the first regular passenger service to cross the spectacular and historic Welland Viaduct since 1966. The company introduced a further return service from Derby via East Midlands Parkway (for East Midlands Airport) from May 2010.

The station retains a ticket office which is staffed seven days a week, a car park, and help points for times where there are no staff present.

Former services

Prior to the Beeching Axe, trains used to stop at a number of smaller village destinations in Rutland. These were closed between 1961 and 1966.

Summary of former services

References

External links

Railway stations in Rutland
DfT Category E stations
Former Midland Railway stations
Railway stations in Great Britain opened in 1848
Grade II listed buildings in Rutland
Railway stations served by East Midlands Railway
Railway stations served by CrossCountry
Oakham